Stanley Lake is an alpine lake in the western United States, located in Custer County, Idaho, at the base of the Sawtooth Mountains in the Sawtooth National Recreation Area.

Stanley Lake is northeast of the base of the  McGown Peak, and just south of the considerably smaller Elk Peak.

Recreational facilities at the lake include three campgrounds with nightly fees, a day use area, a boat launch, and hiking trails.

See also
 List of lakes of the Sawtooth Mountains (Idaho)
 Sawtooth National Forest
 Sawtooth National Recreation Area
 Sawtooth Range (Idaho)

References

External links
 Public Lands.org - Stanley Lake
 Fishing Works.com - Stanley Lake
 U.S. Forest Service - Sawtooth National Recreation Area

Lakes of Idaho
Lakes of Custer County, Idaho
Glacial lakes of the United States
Glacial lakes of the Sawtooth National Forest